Cilvēka bērns is a 1991 Latvian film directed by Jānis Streičs, starring Akvelīna Līvmane, Jānis Paukštello, and others. The film was selected as the Latvian entry for the Best Foreign Language Film at the 65th Academy Awards, but was not accepted as a nominee.

The film was awarded the Latvian National Film Prize Lielais Kristaps in 1991 for the best film of the year. In 1994, along with Karakum, it received the "Rights of the Child Award" in the Chicago International Children's Film Festival.

Cast
Akvelīna Līvmane ..... Mother mau
Jānis Paukštello ..... Father
Boļeslavs Ružs ..... Grandfather
Andrejs Rudzinskis ..... Bonifaicijs
Signe Dundure ..... Bigi
Mārtiņš Dančausks ..... Pēteris
Agnese Latovska ..... Paulīne
Romualds Ancāns
Uva Segliņa

See also
 List of submissions to the 65th Academy Awards for Best Foreign Language Film
 List of Latvian submissions for the Academy Award for Best Foreign Language Film

References

External links 
 

1991 films
Latvian comedy films
Latvian-language films
Films based on novels
Latvian drama films